Arbasus is a genus of armoured harvestmen in the family Cladonychiidae. There is one described species in Arbasus, A. caecus. It is found in the Pyrenees of southern France.

References

Further reading

 
 
 

Harvestmen